The Brown Hall in Socorro, New Mexico is a New Mexico Institute of Mining and Technology campus building built in 1929.  It was designed by George Williamson in Mission Revival style, with Spanish Colonial Baroque elements.

It is an I-shaped masonry and stucco building.

It was listed on the National Register of Historic Places in 1989.

References

National Register of Historic Places in Socorro County, New Mexico
Mission Revival architecture in New Mexico
Buildings and structures completed in 1929